Jindai-ji may refer to:

 Jindai-ji (Chiba), a temple in Chiba, Japan
 Jindai-ji (Tokyo), a temple in Chōfu, Tokyo, Japan